Smaragdia viridis. common name the "emerald nerite" is a species of small, green sea snail, a marine gastropod mollusk in the family Neritidae, the nerites.

Distribution
The distribution of Smaragdia viridis is disjunct, consisting of the Mediterranean Sea and the Caribbean Sea.

Description
The shell is oval, depressed, light green with a yellowish hue, smooth and shiny. The shell often has interrupted fine bands or lines in white and/or purple. The columellar region of the shell is greenish white, broad, convex, margin curved and with fine teeth. The maximum length of the shell is 7.5 mm. The maximum recorded shell length is 8 mm.

The visible soft parts of the animal are the same shade of green as the shell.

Ecology 
Smaragdia viridis is a marine littoral species. Minimum recorded depth is 0 m. Maximum recorded depth is 20 m. It is documented to feed directly on seagrasses, rather than on their algae epiphytes, as is the case with many other seagrass-associated snails. The species it feeds on are different in the two different areas of its distribution. In the Mediterranean the species has been recorded feeding on Posidonia oceanica, Zostera marina and Cymodocea nodosa whereas in the Caribbean it consumes Thalassia testudinum, Halodule wrightii and Syringodium filiforme.

References
This article incorporates public domain text from the reference

  Savigny, J-.C., 1817  Description de l'Egypte, ou recueil des observations et des recherches qui ont été faites en Egypte pendant l'expédition de l'Armée française, publié par les ordres de sa Majesté l'Empereur Napoléon le Grand. Histoire Naturelle, p. 339 pp
 Russell H. D. 1940. Some new Neritidae from the West Indies. Memorias de la Sociedad Cubana de Historia Natural “Felipe Poey”, 14(4): 257-262, pl. 46.
 Bouchet, P. & Danrigal, F., 1982. - Napoleon's Egyptian campaign (1798-1801) and the Savigny collection of shells. The Nautilus 96(1): 9-24
 Holzer, K. K.; Rueda, J. L.; McGlathery, K. J. (2011). Differences in the feeding ecology of two seagrass-associated snails. Estuaries and Coasts, 10 pp
 Rolán E., 2005. Malacological Fauna From The Cape Verde Archipelago. Part 1, Polyplacophora and Gastropoda.
 Rosenberg, G.; Moretzsohn, F.; García, E. F. (2009). Gastropoda (Mollusca) of the Gulf of Mexico, Pp. 579–699 in: Felder, D.L. and D.K. Camp (eds.), Gulf of Mexico–Origins, Waters, and Biota. Texas A&M Press, College Station, Texas
 Fischer-Piette, E. & Vukadinovic, D. (1973). Sur les Mollusques Fluviatiles de Madagascar. Malacologia. 12: 339-378.

External links
 Risso, A. (1826-1827). Histoire naturelle des principales productions de l'Europe Méridionale et particulièrement de celles des environs de Nice et des Alpes Maritimes. Paris, F.G. Levrault. 3(XVI): 1-480, 14 pls
 Linnaeus, C. (1758). Systema Naturae per regna tria naturae, secundum classes, ordines, genera, species, cum characteribus, differentiis, synonymis, locis. Editio decima, reformata [10th revised edition, vol. 1: 824 pp. Laurentius Salvius: Holmiae.]
 Audouin V. (1826) Explication sommaire des planches de Mollusques de l'Egypte et de la Syrie publiées par J.C. Savigny. in: Description de l'Egypte ou recueil des observations et des recherches qui ont été faites en Egypte pendant l'expédition de l'armée française, publié par les ordres de sa majesté l'empereur Napoléon le grand. Histoire Naturelle, Animaux invertébrés 1(4): 7-56. Paris: Imprimerie impériale

Neritidae
Gastropods described in 1758
Taxa named by Carl Linnaeus